Limestone Township may refer to one of the following places in the State of Illinois:

 Limestone Township, Kankakee County, Illinois
 Limestone Township, Peoria County, Illinois

See also

Limestone Township (disambiguation)

Illinois township disambiguation pages